Juliet Emma Aubrey (born 17 December 1966) is a British actress of theatre, film, and television. She won the 1995 BAFTA TV Award for Best Actress for playing Dorothea in the BBC serial Middlemarch (1994). She is also known for her role as Helen Cutter in the ITV series Primeval (2007–2011). Her film appearances include Still Crazy (1998), The Constant Gardener (2005) and The Infiltrator (2016).

Career
The youngest of three siblings, Aubrey was born and brought up in Fleet, Hampshire. Aubrey attended King's College London from 1984, where she studied Classics and Archaeology. While there, however, her love of acting grew, and during a year studying in Italy where she joined a travelling theatre company, Aubrey decided to apply for drama school on her return. She went on to train for three years at the Central School of Speech and Drama.

Her first job was with the Oxford Stage Company playing Miranda in The Tempest. Italian director Roberto Faenza gave Aubrey her first film role playing opposite Jean-Hugues Anglade in Look to the Sky, a film produced by Elda Ferri, and set during the Nazi Holocaust.  Antony Page and Louis Marks then cast Aubrey as Dorothea in the BBC adaptation of Middlemarch opposite Rufus Sewell, for which she won a BAFTA award for Best Actress, and the Broadcasting Press Guild for Best Actress. She then joined Haris Pasovic's Sarajevo Theatre Company. She appeared in several plays with the company, all created through the actors' improvisation. She continued to build her career as a theatre actress, appearing next in Trevor Nunn's Summerfolk and Katie Mitchell's Ivanov at the National Theatre, Tim Crouch's An Oak Tree for Karl James at the Soho Theatre, and Three Sisters, Twelfth Night and The Collection, all for Chris White. Michael Winterbottom then cast her opposite Robert Carlyle and James Nesbitt in the television film Go Now.

Aubrey's subsequent films include Winterbottom's Welcome to Sarajevo, Stephen Poliakoff's Food of Love — for which she won Best Actress at La Baule European Film Festival — Faenza's Lost Lover, Giacomo Campiotti's Time to Love, Richard Eyre's Iris, Fernando Meirelles's Constant Gardener and Brian Gibson's Still Crazy, nominated for two Golden Globes. Other features include Matt Lipsey's Caught in the Act, and Mat Cod's Super Eruption. Television work includes The Village; The White Queen, Criminal Justice, Vera, Hunted, and Five Daughters.  Her recent feature films are Scott Hicks's Fallen; Mitch Davis's Stuck; Fabio Guaglione's Mine; and Brad Furman's Infiltrator. Aubrey played Lily Hill in the 2017 web television series Snatch.

Personal life

In 2001, Aubrey married production designer Steve Ritchie, whom she had met several years earlier while filming in Newcastle upon Tyne. They have two daughters.

She is a cousin of David Howell Evans (a.k.a. "The Edge"), guitarist of the Irish band U2.

Filmography

References

External links

1966 births
Living people
Actresses from Hampshire
English film actresses
English stage actresses
English television actresses
English people of Welsh descent
People from Fleet, Hampshire
Alumni of King's College London
Best Actress BAFTA Award (television) winners
20th-century English actresses
21st-century English actresses
English voice actresses
English radio actresses